The 2011 Thai League Cup is the 2nd season of the longest-running Football Association of Thailand cup competition. 97 clubs were accepted for the competition, this is the first edition of the competition and the qualifying round will be played in regions featuring clubs from the Regional League Division 2. Tak , Mahasarakham United and Thanyaburi RA United have lucky of lotting to automatic qualify to First round.

Calendar

Northern Region
The qualifying round will be played in regions featuring clubs from the 2011 Thai Division 2 League Northern Region
(6 berth including Tak have lucky of lotting to automatic qualify to First round.)

Qualifying First round

|colspan="3" style="background-color:#99CCCC"|18 May 2011

|}

North Eastern Region
The qualifying round will be played in regions featuring clubs from the 2011 Thai Division 2 League North Eastern Region
(6 berth including Mahasarakham United have lucky of lotting to automatic qualify to First round.)

Qualifying First round

|colspan="3" style="background-color:#99CCCC"|18 May 2011

|}

Qualifying Second round

|colspan="3" style="background-color:#99CCCC"|1 June 2011

|}

Central & Eastern Region
The qualifying round will be played in regions featuring clubs from the 2011 Thai Division 2 League Central & Eastern Region
(6 berth )

Qualifying First round

|colspan="3" style="background-color:#99CCCC"|18 May 2011

|}

Qualifying Second round

|colspan="3" style="background-color:#99CCCC"|1 June 2011

|}

Bangkok & field Region
The qualifying round will be played in regions featuring clubs from the 2011 Thai Division 2 League Bangkok & field Region
(6 berth including Thanyaburi RA United have lucky of lotting to automatic qualify to First round.)

Qualifying First round

|colspan="3" style="background-color:#99CCCC"|18 May 2011

|}

Qualifying Second round

|colspan="3" style="background-color:#99CCCC"|1 June 2011

|-
|colspan="3" style="background-color:#99CCCC"|2 June 2011

|}

Southern Region
The qualifying round will be played in regions featuring clubs from the 2011 Thai Division 2 League Southern Region
(4 berth )

Qualifying First round

|colspan="3" style="background-color:#99CCCC"|18 May 2011

|}
 1 Nakhon Si Thammarat won because Chumphon withdrew

Qualified teams
Northern

Nan
Phetchabun
Phrae United
Singburi
Nakhon Sawan

North Eastern

Nakhon Ratchasima 
Udon Thani
Kalasin
Nakhon Phanom
Roi Et United

Central & Eastern

Ayutthaya
Phetchaburi
Ang Thong
Kabin City
Samut Prakan
Rayong

Bangkok & field

Chamchuri United
Kasetsart University
Prachinburi
Maptaphut Rayong
Kasem Bundit University

Southern

Nakhon Si Thammarat
Pattani
Phattalung
Trang

See also
2011 Thai League Cup
Final

2